The Frumoasa-Tazlău mine is a large potash mine located in eastern Romania in Bacău County, close to Balcani. Frumoasa-Tazlău represents one of the largest potash reserves in Romania having estimated reserves of 200 million tonnes of ore grading 10% potassium chloride metal.

References 

Potash mines in Romania